Minuscule 772 (in the Gregory-Aland numbering), Θε418 (von Soden), is a Greek minuscule manuscript of the New Testament written on parchment. Palaeographically it has been assigned to the 14th century. The manuscript has no complex contents. Scrivener labelled it as 867e.

Description 
The codex contains the text of the four Gospels, on 387 parchment leaves (size ), with some lacunae. The texts of Matthew 1:1-6:18 and John 21:24.25 were supplied by a later hand from the 16th century on paper. The text is written in one column per page, 28-31 lines per page.

Lectionary markings were added by a later hand. It contains a commentary of Theophylact.

Text 
Kurt Aland did not place the Greek text of the codex in any Category. It was not examined by the Claremont Profile Method.

The lacks the Pericope Adulterae (John 7:53-8:11).

History 
F. H. A. Scrivener dated the manuscript to the 15th century; Gregory dated the manuscript to the 12th century. The manuscript is currently dated by the INTF to the 14th century.

The manuscript was noticed in a catalogue from 1876.

It was added to the list of New Testament manuscripts by Scrivener (867) and Gregory (772). Gregory saw the manuscript in 1886.

The manuscript is now housed at the National Library of Greece (489) in Athens.

See also 

 List of New Testament minuscules
 Biblical manuscript
 Textual criticism
 Minuscule 771

References

Further reading 

 

Greek New Testament minuscules
14th-century biblical manuscripts
Manuscripts of the National Library of Greece